Anna Vasilyevna Shukina (also transliterated as Shchukina or Schukina; born 5 November 1987) is a Russian retired ice hockey defenceman and former member of the Russian national ice hockey team.

In December 2017, Shukina was banned for life by the Oswald Commission of the International Olympic Committee (IOC) for doping violations made while participating in the women's ice hockey tournament at the 2014 Winter Olympics. She filed an appeal with the Court of Arbitration for Sport (CAS) and, in 2018, won the appeal and the sanctions against her were annulled.

Shukina has twice been on Russian Championship winning teams, Tornado Dmitrov in 2015 and Agidel Ufa in 2017. She has also received individual Zhenskaya Hockey League (ZhHL) awards for Most Goals by a Defenceman in the 2015–16 season, while playing with Dynamo Saint Petersburg, and in the 2016–17 season, while playing with Agidel Ufa, and Most Points by a Defenceman in the 2015–16 season. She also played seven seasons with SKIF Nizhny Novgorod and served as captain during the 2019–20 season.

International career
Shukina was selected for the Russian national team in the 2014 Winter Olympics. She played in all six games of the tournament and scored two goals.

Shukina represented Russia at eight IIHF Women's World Championships. Her first appearance came in 2008 and she won bronze medals as part of the team in 2013 and 2016.

Though the ban was annulled in 2018, Shukina did not represent Russia in any international competition following the 2017 IOC ban for doping violations.

Career statistics

International career
Through 2013–14 season

References

External links
 
 
 

1987 births
Living people
People from Alexandrovsky District, Vladimir Oblast
Russian women's ice hockey defencemen
HC SKIF players
HC Tornado players
HC Agidel Ufa players
Olympic ice hockey players of Russia
Ice hockey players at the 2014 Winter Olympics
Universiade medalists in ice hockey
Russian sportspeople in doping cases
Doping cases in ice hockey
Universiade gold medalists for Russia
Universiade silver medalists for Russia
Competitors at the 2013 Winter Universiade
Competitors at the 2015 Winter Universiade
Sportspeople from Vladimir Oblast